Alayna Snell (born 6 March 1961) is a fencer from the United States Virgin Islands. She competed in the women's individual foil event at the 1984 Summer Olympics.

References

External links
 

1961 births
Living people
United States Virgin Islands female foil fencers
Olympic fencers of the United States Virgin Islands
Fencers at the 1984 Summer Olympics
21st-century American women